Gunnar Garfors (born 29 May 1975) is a Norwegian traveler, author, media professional, and public speaker. Garfors was the first person to visit every country in the world twice, he holds a range of travel world records and has written several travel books. The Norwegian has worked with broadcasting and new media developments since 2001 and has spoken on these topics at seminars and conferences in over 20 countries around the world. He strongly advocates for the necessity of broadcasting as a distribution technology, in parallel to the Internet.

Early life 
Garfors is the oldest of seven children. He was born in Hammerfest in Northern Norway but soon moved to Naustdal on the country's west coast where he grew up with his mother Ruth Berit Stensletten Garfors, his father Reidar Magne Garfors and his six siblings. He has also lived in Havøysund, Førde, Dublin, Falmouth, Copenhagen and Taipei. He now lives in Oslo.

Garfors holds a bachelor's degree (Hons) from Falmouth College of Arts in Great Britain and a Master of Management degree from Norwegian School of Management.

Travels 
Garfors has visited every country in the world and is the youngest hobby traveller to have done so. December 
16, 2018 he visited Estonia to become the first person to visit all 198 countries in the world twice. On 18 June 2012 he set a Guinness world record together with Adrian Butterworth from Britain by being the first to visit five continents in the same day. Garfors beat another Guinness world record on February 2, 2018 when he circumnavigated the world via the six inhabited continents on scheduled aircraft in 56 hours and 56 minutes together with Dutchmen Erik de Zwart and Ronald Haanstra. He holds several other travel related world records, including one set in September 2014 with friends Øystein Djupvik and Tay-young Pak when they visited 19 countries in 24 hours. Garfors also writes garfors.com, a blog on travel.

Writings 
Garfors' first book "198 - Mi reise til alle verdas land" ("198 – My Journey to Every Country in the World") was published by Norwegian publisher Samlaget in September 2014 and later self-published in English as "198: How I Ran Out of Countries" in 2015. An essay of his was also included in the collection "Ete fysst" ("Eat first") in 2014. His second book "Ingenstad" ("Elsewhere") came out in 2019, and was self-published in English 2021. It goes in depth about the world's 20 least-visited countries, and is the first literary work to collect tourist figures to all 198 countries. The rights to "Ingenstad" has since been sold to Hungarian publisher Cser Kiadó. His third book "Bortom allfarveg - 81 reisetips til ein spektakulær noregsferie" ("Beyond the Beaten Track – 81 travel tips to a spectacular holiday in Norway") came out in April 2021 and sold out in only four days. Later the same year it featured on the Norwegian non-fiction bestseller list for 12 weeks. He has had articles published in Afghanistan, Brazil, Germany, the UK and the USA. Additionally he wrote a bimonthly travel column in the Japanese newspaper Mainichi Shimbun in 2013-2015 and occasionally delivers travel articles from Norway to The Guardian.

Presentations and speeches 
Garfors has participated in panel discussions or presented at media conferences in over 20 countries on six continents and has spoken at travel presentations internationally, i.e. at TEDx in Binghamton, New York in 2017 and The Telegraph Travel Show in London in 2017. Schools, colleges, universities, libraries, prisons and corporate entities have also had Garfors present at various events.

Broadcasting 
He works as an advisor for broadcasting and new media at the Norwegian Broadcasting Corporation (NRK) in Oslo, is president of IDAG (the International DMB Advancement Group) and sat one year as vice president of the mobile expert group of the European Broadcasting Union in 2008 and 2009. Garfors was CEO of Norwegian Mobile TV Corporation in 2008–2013. The company was the first in Europe to launch mobile TV services via DMB in 2009. In 2004, he headed the launch of live TV to mobile phones for NRK as the first in the world. He was one of the pioneers of a number of other innovative mobile services, i.e. the world's first personalized ads in a mobile TV service and advanced forms of interactivity that combined mobile services and television.

Football 
He used to play football for Førde IL in Norwegian Second and Third Division in the 1990s and was the team's top goal scorer for two seasons. Garfors played for Falmouth Town 1995–98 and trained with Plymouth Argyle in English Division 2 in 1996.

References

External links
 The Garfors Globe

1975 births
Living people
Travelers
Circumnavigators_of_the_globe
People from Hammerfest
People from Naustdal
Writers from Oslo
Alumni of Falmouth University
NRK people
Falmouth Town A.F.C. players
Association footballers not categorized by position
Norwegian columnists
Norwegian footballers
Television people from Oslo